White coat hypertension (WHT), more commonly known as white coat syndrome, is a form of labile hypertension in which people exhibit a blood pressure level above the normal range in a clinical setting, although they do not exhibit it in other settings. It is believed that the phenomenon is due to anxiety experienced during a clinic visit.

The patient's daytime ambulatory blood pressure is used as a reference as it takes into account ordinary levels of daily stress. Many problems have been incurred in the diagnosis and treatment of white coat hypertension.

Masked hypertension (MH) is the contrasting phenomenon, whereby a patient's blood pressure is above the normal range during daily living but not in a clinic setting.

Diagnosis
In studies, white coat hypertension can be defined as the presence of a defined hypertensive average blood pressure in a clinic setting, although it isn't present when the patient is at home.

Diagnosis is made difficult as a result of the unreliable measures taken from the conventional methods of detection. These methods often involve an interface with health care professionals and frequently results are tarnished by a list of factors including variability in the individual's blood pressure, technical inaccuracies, anxiety of the patient, recent ingestion of pressor substances, and talking, amongst many other factors. The most common measure of blood pressure is taken from a noninvasive instrument called a sphygmomanometer. "A survey showed that 96% of primary care physicians habitually use a cuff size too small," adding to the difficulty in making an informed diagnosis. For such reasons, white coat hypertension cannot be diagnosed with a standard clinical visit. It can be reduced (but not eliminated) with automated blood pressure measurements over 15 to 20 minutes in a quiet part of the office or clinic.

Patients with white coat hypertension do not exhibit the signs indicative of trepidation and their increased blood pressure is often not accompanied by tachycardia. This is supported by studies that repeatedly indicate that 15%–30% of those thought to have mild hypertension as a result of clinic or office recordings display normal blood pressure and no unusual response to pressure stimulus. These persons did not show any specific characteristics such as age that may be indicative of a higher susceptibility to white coat hypertension.

Ambulatory blood pressure monitoring and patient self-measurement using a home blood pressure monitoring device is being increasingly used to differentiate those with white coat hypertension or experiencing the white coat effect from those with chronic hypertension. This does not mean that these methods are without fault. Daytime ambulatory values, despite taking into account stresses of everyday life when taken during the patient's daily routine, are still susceptible to the effects of daily variables such as physical activity, stress and duration of sleep. Ambulatory monitoring has been found to be the more practical and reliable method in detecting patients with white coat hypertension and for the prediction of target organ damage. Even as such, the diagnosis and treatment of white coat hypertension remains controversial.

Recent studies showed that home blood pressure monitoring is as accurate as a 24-hour ambulatory monitoring in determining blood pressure levels. Researchers at the University of Turku, Finland studied 98 patients with untreated hypertension. They compared patients using a home blood pressure device and those wearing a 24-hour ambulatory monitor. Researcher Dr. Niiranen said that "home blood pressure measurement can be used effectively for guiding anti-hypertensive treatment". Dr. Stergiou added that home tracking of blood pressure "is more convenient and also less costly than ambulatory monitoring."

Use of breathing patterns has been proposed as a technique for identifying white coat hypertension.

In one Turkish study of 438 consecutive patients, 38% were normotensive, 43% had white coat hypertension, 2% had masked hypertension, and 15% had sustained hypertension. Even patients taking medication for sustained hypertension who are normotensive at home may exhibit white coat hypertension in the office setting.

Implications for treatment
In general, individuals with white coat hypertension have lower morbidity than patients with sustained hypertension, but higher morbidity than the clinically normotensive. However all published trials on the consequences of high blood pressure and the benefits of treating, are based on one-time measurement in clinical settings rather than the generally lower readings obtained from ambulatory recordings.

The debate and conflicting ideas revolve around whether or not it would be feasible to treat white coat hypertension, as there still is no conclusive evidence that a temporary rise in blood pressure during office visits has an adverse effect on health.

In fact, many cross sectional studies have shown that "target-organ damage (as exemplified by left ventricular hypertrophy) is less in white-coat hypertensive patients than in sustained hypertensive patients even after the allowance has been made for differences in clinic pressure". Many believe that patients with "white coat" hypertension do not require even very small doses of antihypertensive therapy as it may result in hypotension, but must still be careful as patients may show signs of vascular changes and may eventually develop hypertension. Even patients with established hypertension that is well-controlled based on home blood pressure monitoring may experience elevated readings during office visits.

References

External links 

Hypertension